Goniopectinidae is a family of echinoderms belonging to the order Paxillosida.

Genera:
 Chrispaulia Gale, 2005
 Goniopecten Perrier, 1881
 Pectinidiscus Ludwig, 1907
 Prionaster Verrill, 1899

References

Paxillosida
Echinoderm families